The 2007 Australian Performance Car Championship was a CAMS sanctioned national motor racing championship, organised by GT Performance Racing Pty Ltd. It was the third championship to be contested under the Australian Performance Car Championship name, with similar titles having been contested in both 2003 and 2004 as the Australian GT Performance Car Championship. The 2007 championship was won by Gary Young, driving a Mitsubishi Lancer EVO VIII RS.

Calendar
The championship was contested over a six round series. Each round was held over three races.

Note: The proposed opening round at Wakefield Park was conducted as a non-championship event.

Note: The Hidden Valley and Symmons Plains rounds carried double championship points.

Results

Privateers Cup

Privateers Cup cars were restricted to grooved Pirelli tyres, whereas Outright Class cars could use slick tyres.

References

Australian Performance Car Championship
Performance Car Championship